Florentino Ameghino is a  department of Chubut Province, it is located on the Atlantic coast of Argentina

The provincial subdivision has a population of about 1,484 inhabitants in an area of 16,088 km², and its capital city is Camarones, which is located around 1,654 km from the Capital federal.

The department is noted for its wealth of geological and paleontological features. Specimens from the region are on display in a number of museums worldwide.

The department is named in honour of Florentino Ameghino (September 18, 1854 – August 6, 1911), an Argentinian naturalist, paleontologist, anthropologist and zoologist

Economy

The economy of Florentino Ameghino and its head town is dominated by tourism. People are attracted to the region by its lengthy unspoiled coastline, its geography and fauna, especially the penguin colonies.

Attractions

Fiesta Nacional de Salmon (National Salmon Festival)
Cabo Dos Bahías

Settlements

Camarones
Malaspina
La Esther
Garayalde
Caleta Hornos
Uzcudun
Florentino Ameghino
Cabo Raso
Puesto El Palenque

External links
Camarones Website 

States and territories established in 1900
Departments of Chubut Province